Nidaros Futsal is a futsal club based in Trondheim, Norway, the club was founded in 2003. They won the first official Norwegian Futsal Premier League in 2008–09.

Current squad

Honours 
Norwegian Futsal Premier League: 2008–09

External links
nidaros-futsal.no
nidarosfutsal.com

Futsal clubs in Norway
Sport in Trondheim
Futsal clubs established in 2003
2003 establishments in Norway